Paulo Jorge Soares Gomes (born 16 June 1980), known as Paulo Jorge, is a Portuguese retired professional footballer who played as a central defender, currently assistant manager of S.C. Braga B.

He played until the age of 29 with Braga, appearing in 166 official matches over seven Primeira Liga seasons. He finished his 16-year senior career in Cyprus.

Club career
Born in Braga, Paulo Jorge played for hometown club S.C. Braga for the vast majority of his career, which he began as a professional in the 2002–03 season. From his early Primeira Liga debut, he was awarded team captaincy.

Although a defensive player, Paulo Jorge scored five league goals in 2006–07 to help the team finish fourth, as well as two in the UEFA Cup against A.C. ChievoVerona and Tottenham Hotspur. In 2008–09, he was absent for the vast majority of the matches due to several surgeries to repair a foot ailment; his return only took place on 1 May 2009 against Rio Ave FC (0–0), and it was the sole appearance he made during the campaign.

On 10 June 2009, the board of APOEL FC announced the signing of Paulo Jorge on a two-year deal. In his first year, he won the Cypriot Super Cup and took part in three group stage games in their first participation in the UEFA Champions League.

On 12 May 2011, after helping APOEL win the national championship, the 31-year-old Paulo Jorge renewed his contract for another year. The following campaign, he featured in nine Champions League matches in the side's surprising run to the quarter-finals.

On 13 May 2012, Paulo Jorge signed a two-year contract with another team in the country, Anorthosis Famagusta FC. He retired at the age of 35, after one season with Doxa Katokopias FC.

Paulo Jorge returned to APOEL on 22 March 2018, as assistant manager under compatriot Bruno Baltazar.

Club statistics

Honours
APOEL
Cypriot First Division: 2010–11
Cypriot Super Cup: 2009, 2011

References

External links

1980 births
Living people
Sportspeople from Braga
Portuguese footballers
Association football defenders
Primeira Liga players
Segunda Divisão players
S.C. Braga B players
S.C. Braga players
Cypriot First Division players
APOEL FC players
Anorthosis Famagusta F.C. players
Doxa Katokopias FC players
Portugal youth international footballers
Portuguese expatriate footballers
Expatriate footballers in Cyprus
Portuguese expatriate sportspeople in Cyprus
Portuguese football managers